The 1996 Grand Prix was a professional ranking snooker tournament that took place between 16–27 October 1996 at the Bournemouth International Centre in Bournemouth, England.



Prize fund
The breakdown of prize money for this year is shown below:

Winner: £60,000
Runner up: £32,000
Semi-finalists: £16,000
Quarter-finalists: £9,050
Last 16: £4,550
Last 32: £2,600
Last 64: £1,900

Stage one High Break: £3,600
Stage two High Break: £5,000

Total: £330,000

Main draw

Final

Century breaks

Qualifying stage centuries

 145  Matthew Stevens
 135, 132, 104  Alfie Burden
 128  David Gray
 121  Danny Lathouwers
 117  Richy McDonald
 116  Tai Pichit
 114, 110  Simon Bedford
 110, 101  Ian McCulloch
 109  Dylan Leary
 109  Suriya Suwannasingh
 105  Robert Milkins
 100  Johl Younger

Televised stage centuries

 138, 100  Mark Williams
 133, 100, 106, 102  Euan Henderson
 133  Tony Drago
 131, 130, 129  James Wattana
 131, 113  Ronnie O'Sullivan
 130  Chris Small
 128, 103  John Parrott
 125  Andy Hicks
 112  John Higgins
 107  Fergal O'Brien
 106  Nick Pearce
 105  Jamie Burnett
 101  Gary Wilkinson

References

1996
Grand Prix
Grand Prix (snooker)
Grand Prix